Sanchai Ratiwatana  and Sonchat Ratiwatana are the defending champions, but decided not to participate.

Toshihide Matsui and Danai Udomchoke defeated the Chinese pairing of Gong Maoxin and Zhang Ze 4–6, 7–6(8–6), [10–8].

Seeds

Draw

References 
 Main Draw

Beijing International Challenger - Men's Doubles
2013 Men's Doubles